The Backsliders are an alternative-traditional country-rock band. Chip Robinson teamed up with Steve Howell to form the band as a duo in 1991 in Athens, GA. The remaining members had all joined the group by 1994, and the group disbanded in 1999.  They reunited in late 2012.

Band members
Chip Robinson - vocals, guitar 
Stephen Howell - guitar, vocals 
Greg Rice - keyboards 
Danny Kurtz - bass 
Jeff Dennis - drums

Discography
1996 From Raleigh, North Carolina
1997 Throwin' Rocks at the Moon - (produced by Dwight Yoakam’s longtime guitarist, Pete Anderson) -  # 1 on the Americana radio chart
1999 Southern Lines - (produced by Eric Ambel)
2014 Raleighwood (EP) - named after a tour slogan and sign erected over the ruins of The Brewery, a bar where the band got its start.

Other
 
1997 Crash Course - various artists – track # 6 "My Baby's Gone" 
1998 The Songs Of Dwight Yoakam: Will Sing For Food - various artists – track # 2 "Doin' What I Did"  
2007 Bug - original motion picture soundtrack - various artists – track # 4 "Cowboy Boots"

See also
Jeff Hart and the Ruins - Chip Robinson
Son Volt - Brad Rice
Tift Merritt - Brad Rice
Ryan Adams - Brad Rice

References

External links
The Backsliders

Backsliders, The